Edward Hastings, 2nd Baron Hastings, KB PC (26 November 1466 – 8 November 1506) was an English peer.

Origins
Edward Hastings was born in Kirby Muxloe Castle, Leicestershire to Sir William Hastings, 1st Baron Hastings and Katherine Neville, the daughter of Richard Neville, 5th Earl of Salisbury, and Alice Montagu, the daughter of Thomas Montagu, 4th Earl of Salisbury. At the time of the marriage Katherine Neville was the widow of William Bonville, 6th Baron Harington (1442–1460), beheaded after the Battle of Wakefield, by whom she had a daughter, Cecily. Edward Hastings had three brothers, Sir William, Sir Richard, and George, and two sisters, Anne, who married George Talbot, 4th Earl of Shrewsbury, and Elizabeth. His brothers William and Richard were alive at the time he made his will on 4 November 1506.

Career
Edward Hastings was invested as a Knight of the Bath in 1475. He was High Steward of the Honour of Leicester in 1485.  He was Constable of Leicester Castle 1485.  He was High Forester of Southwood in 1488.  He was appointed a Privy Councillor in 1504.

Marriage and Family
Between 1478 and 1480, he married Mary Hungerford (born c. 1468 – died before 10 July 1533), daughter of Sir Thomas Hungerford of Rowden and Anne Percy, daughter of Henry Percy, 2nd Earl of Northumberland, and Eleanor Neville. Edward Hastings and Mary Hungerford had two sons and a daughter:

George Hastings, 1st Earl of Huntingdon (1486/7 – 24 March 1544), who married Anne Stafford, widow of Sir Walter Herbert, and daughter of Henry Stafford, 2nd Duke of Buckingham, and Katherine Wydeville
William Hastings, who may have predeceased his father, as he is not mentioned in his will
Anne Hastings (1485 – buried 17 November 1550), who married Thomas Stanley, 2nd Earl of Derby

While he was still only a youth 16 years of age, his father William Hastings, 1st Baron Hastings, incurred the enmity of Richard, Duke of Gloucester, and on 13 June 1483 was arrested at a council meeting on Richard's orders, and beheaded without trial, an event dramatised in Shakespeare's Richard III.

Edward Hastings died, aged 39, on 8 November 1506, and is said to have been buried at the Blackfriars, London. On 1 May 1509 his widow married Sir Richard Sacheverell (d. 14 April 1534), but had no issue by him. She died before 10 July 1533, and was buried at Leicester.

Footnotes

References

Ancestry

1466 births
1506 deaths
People from Kirby Muxloe
Knights of the Bath
Edward Hastings, 2nd Baron Hastings
15th-century English people
16th-century English nobility
Members of the Privy Council of England
Barons Hastings